Nathan Walsh (born 1998) is an Irish Gaelic footballer who plays for Cork Senior Championship club Douglas and at inter-county level with the Cork senior football team. He usually lines out as a right corner-back.

Honours

University College Cork
Sigerson Cup (1): 2019

Douglas
Cork Premier Under-21 A Football Championship (1): 2017
Cork Premier Under-21 A Hurling Championship (1): 2016
Cork Premier 1 Minor Hurling Championship (1): 2015

Career statistics

References

1998 births
Living people
UCC Gaelic footballers
Douglas Gaelic footballers
Douglas hurlers
Cork inter-county Gaelic footballers